The Canton of Beaumetz-lès-Loges is a former canton situated in the department of the Pas-de-Calais and in the Nord-Pas-de-Calais region of northern France. It was disbanded following the French canton reorganisation which came into effect in March 2015. It had a total of 11,999 inhabitants (2012, without double counting).

Geography 
The canton was organized around Beaumetz-les-Loges in the arrondissement of Arras. The altitude varies from 67m (Agnez-lès-Duisans) to 178m (La Herlière) for an average altitude of 109m.

The canton comprised 29 communes:

Adinfer
Agnez-lès-Duisans
Bailleulmont
Bailleulval
Basseux
Beaumetz-lès-Loges
Berles-au-Bois
Berneville
Blairville
Boiry-Saint-Martin
Boiry-Sainte-Rictrude
La Cauchie
Ficheux
Fosseux
Gouves
Gouy-en-Artois
Habarcq
Haute-Avesnes
Hendecourt-lès-Ransart
La Herlière
Mercatel
Monchiet
Monchy-au-Bois
Montenescourt
Ransart
Rivière
Simencourt
Wanquetin
Warlus

Population

See also
Cantons of Pas-de-Calais
Communes of Pas-de-Calais
Arrondissements of the Pas-de-Calais department

References

Beaumetz-les-Loges
2015 disestablishments in France
States and territories disestablished in 2015